The Palestinian National Salvation Front (PNSF) was a coalition of Palestinian factions. The creation of the Palestinian National Salvation Front was announced on March 25, 1985, by Khalid al-Fahum. The front consisted of the PFLP, PFLP-GC, as-Sa'iqa, the Palestinian Popular Struggle Front, the Palestinian Liberation Front (Talat Yaqub wing) and Fatah al-Intifada. The Front was founded in reaction to the Amman Accord between Yasser Arafat and King Hussein of Jordan.

The Palestinian National Salvation Front accused the PLO leadership of "surrenderism". It was stressed on behalf of the Front that it was not seeking to replace the PLO, but that its foundation was a temporary measure.

During the War of the Camps the PNSF had its headquarters in Mar Elias refugee camp, which was not one of the camps under siege by Amal. As the fighting continued the PFLP switched its support to Fatah and those trapped in the othe4 camps.  Eventually Abu Musa’s faction was the only group remaining active in the PNSF.

In 1991, the PLO invited the Palestinian National Salvation Front to Tunis for reconciliation talks.

References

1985 establishments in the Israeli Civil Administration area
1990s disestablishments in the Palestinian territories
1991 disestablishments
Defunct Palestinian militant groups
Defunct political party alliances in the Palestinian territories
Organizations associated with the Ba'ath Party
Popular Front for the Liberation of Palestine